Josef Petersen (16 September 1881 – 22 November 1973) was a Danish author, known for many novels with historical motifs, often ancient or medieval, written from 1910 to 1949.

Josef Petersen was the son of a vicar and was a maternal grandson of the Norwegian poet Johann Sebastian Welhaven. Petersen, who worked as a journalist and foreign correspondent, has never been fully recognized by Danish literary historians, though his work was respected by contemporary critics for its knowledge of and identifying with ancient cultures. His best known book is Kongeofret (1923, i.e. The Royal Sacrifice) with Asian motifs, and his Columbus novel En Verden stiger af Havet (1935, i. e. A World Rises from the Sea) is also notable.

Petersen took a special interest in athletics and sport. He was a participant in the last Danish duel in 1913. He won three silver Olympic medals in art for his prose-lyric tales with Ancient Greek athletic themes: "Euryale" (1924), "Argonauterne" (Eng. "The Argonauts") (1932) and "Den Olympiske Mester" (eng. "The Olympic Champion") (1948).

References

External links
 

1881 births
1973 deaths
Danish male novelists
Olympic silver medalists in art competitions
20th-century Danish novelists
Medalists at the 1948 Summer Olympics
Medalists at the 1932 Summer Olympics
Medalists at the 1924 Summer Olympics
20th-century Danish male writers
Olympic competitors in art competitions
20th-century Danish journalists